Lagarto is a municipality located in the Brazilian state of Sergipe. Its population is estimated at 105,221 inhabitants (2020) and its area is 969 km².

Football player Diego Costa was born and raised in Lagarto. The city has one football team called Lagarto Futebol Clube who were founded in 2009 and currently play in the Campeonato Sergipano.

References

Municipalities in Sergipe